Chand is a village and corresponding community development block in Kaimur district, Bihar, India. As of 2011, its population was 4,432, in 700 households. The total block population was 133,682 in 20,413 households.

Geography 
Chand block covers an area of 20,670 hectares.

Demographics 
As of 2011, the sex ratio of Chand block was 921 females to every 1000 males. Among the 0-6 age group, the sex ratio was 934. Members of scheduled castes made up 21.5% of block residents and members of scheduled tribes made up 2.18%. The block's literacy rate was 67.25%, with 77.78% of men and 55.79% of women able to read and write.

Most of Chand block's workforce was employed in agriculture in 2011, with 21.35% of workers being cultivators who owned or leased their own land and another 61.48% being agricultural labourers who worked someone else's land for wages. Another 5.35% of workers were household industry workers, and the remaining 11.81% were other workers.

Villages 
Chand block contains the following 137 villages:

References 

Villages in Kaimur district